{{Automatic taxobox
| image = Mungo1.jpg
| image_caption = Grandidier's mongoose (Galidictis grandidieri)
| taxon = Galidictis
| authority = I. Geoffroy Saint-Hilaire, 1839
| range_map = Galidictis range.png
| range_map_caption = Galidictis ranges
| type_species = Mustela striata| type_species_authority = I. Geoffroy Saint-Hilaire, 1837
| subdivision_ranks = Species
| subdivision = Galidictis fasciataGalidictis grandidieri}}Galidictis is a genus in the subfamily Galidiinae of the family Eupleridae: a group of carnivorans that are endemic to Madagascar.

The name is from two ancient Greek words that both approximately mean ‘weasel’: galid- (see Galidia) and iktis. Compare the word Galictis'' (grison, a closer relative of the weasel).

It contains the following two species and two subspecies:

References

Euplerids
Mammal genera
Endemic fauna of Madagascar
Taxa named by Isidore Geoffroy Saint-Hilaire
Taxonomy articles created by Polbot